Carla Patricia Méndez Mendoza (born 30 January 1997) is a Bolivian footballer who plays as a midfielder. She was a member of the Bolivia women's national team.

Early life
Méndez hails from the Santa Cruz Department.

International career
Méndez represented Bolivia at two South American U-17 Women's Championship editions (2012 and 2013) and the 2014 South American U-20 Women's Championship. At senior level, she played the 2014 Copa América Femenina. She also played a friendly against Brazil in 2017. 
Viajo al brazil a jugar para ferroviaria en brasil durante 6meses 
Campeon de juegos abiertos con ferroviaria 2017

References

1997 births
Living people
Women's association football midfielders
Women's association football forwards
Bolivian women's footballers
People from Santa Cruz Department (Bolivia)
Bolivia women's international footballers